{{Speciesbox
| image = GroseSmithKirby1901RhopExotPlate7.jpg
| image_caption = Figures 1 and 2 (male), 3 (female)
| image2 = 
| taxon = Acraea humilis
| authority = Sharpe, 1897 <ref>Sharpe, E.M. 1897. Descriptions of some new species of Acraeidae collected by Mr. F.J. Jackson at Ntebi [Entebbe], Uganda. Annals and Magazine of Natural History.. (6) 19: 581-582.</ref>

| synonyms = *Acraea (Actinote) humilis}}Acraea humilis'' is a butterfly in the family Nymphalidae. It is found in Uganda, western Kenya and north-western Tanzania.

Description
Both wings transparent without red or yellow scales and above almost alike; the hindwing beneath at the base with some small black dots, which are not visible above; the discal dots are wanting.

Biology
The habitat consists of forests.

Taxonomy
See Pierre & Bernaud, 2014

References

External links

Images representing Acraea humilis at Bold
Acraea humilis at Pteron

Butterflies described in 1897
humilis
Butterflies of Africa
Taxa named by Emily Mary Bowdler Sharpe